15 Éxitos is a compilation album by Mexican singer Alejandra Guzmán. It was released by her former record label Fonovisa and includes fifteen tracks recorded by her from 1988 to 1991.

Track listing

Personnel 

Alejandra Guzmán – vocals
Corky James – acoustic guitar, bass, electric guitar

References

Alejandra Guzmán compilation albums
2002 greatest hits albums
Spanish-language compilation albums
Fonovisa Records compilation albums